Killing Joke is the debut studio album by English post-punk band Killing Joke, released on 5 October 1980 by E.G. via Polydor Records. It debuted at number 41 on the UK Albums Chart on 26 October 1980 and later peaked at number 39.

Background and recording 
Singer and keyboardist Jaz Coleman met drummer Paul Ferguson in late 1978. In February 1979, they put an announcement in Melody Maker with the words: "Bass, lead, to tell the killing joke, we mean it man ! Total exploitation, no information, anonymity". They soon recruited guitarist Geordie Walker and then bassist Youth. After releasing a few singles, they recorded Killing Joke in August 1980 at Marquee Studios in London, shortly after a small tour promoting the Almost Red EP. 

The album was self-produced by the band on purpose. They only wanted an engineer "who can put their technical knowledge into what we want, the way we want it. He's got to take us as we are". They recorded it live in the studio as "basic" as possible with "no overdubs to speak of"; Ferguson explained, "The mixing is where the difference is". Engineer Phil Harding reckons the recording of the album might have only taken two weeks. The album's lyrics were written by Coleman and Ferguson expressing their opinions on issues such as politics, death, hypocrisy, human nature, pollution and exile.

The artwork was based on a photograph by Don McCullin of young rioters trying to escape from clouds of CS gas released by the British Army in Derry, Northern Ireland, on 8 July 1971 during the Troubles. The original picture was taken a few months before the day now known as Bloody Sunday that took place in the same town in early 1972.

Release 
Killing Joke was released on 5 October 1980 by E.G. Records, who were distributed at the time by Polydor Records. It entered the UK Albums Chart on 25 October 1980, and eventually reached number 39.

The album produced two singles: "Wardance" and "Requiem".

The 2005 and 2008 reissues of Killing Joke featured several bonus tracks, such as previously released B-sides and demo tracks.  as it was in the original US release.

Reception 

In his retrospective review, Bradley Torreano of AllMusic praised the album, writing, "Since 1980, there have been a hundred bands who sound like this, but before Steve Albini and Al Jourgensen made it hip, the cold metallic throb of Killing Joke was exciting and fresh", calling it an "underground classic" that "deserves better than its relative unknown status". In the band's biography it was called an "outstanding debut album which captured not only their defining sound, but also the chilling apocalyptic anguish about the world to come."

Sputnikmusic called it a "post-punk masterpiece of tribal funk-rock and grinding heavy metal with suitably doom-mongering lyrics and splenetic vocals". In 2019, Pitchfork placed the album at No. 9 on their "33 Best Industrial Albums of All Time" list.

Legacy 
The album has been called "an underground classic" for fans of "heavy music". Dave Grohl has cited it as one of his favorite albums. "The Wait" was covered by Metallica on The $5.98 E.P. - Garage Days Re-Revisited EP in 1987 and was later featured on Garage Inc. "Primitive" was covered by Helmet in 1993 as the A-side to their "Primitive" single, and later added to their Born Annoying compilation album. "Requiem" was covered by Foo Fighters in 1997 as a B-side to the "Everlong" single. Japanese band The Mad Capsule Markets covered "Wardance" on their 2001 album "010".

The album was included in the book 1001 Albums You Must Hear Before You Die.

Track listing

Personnel 
 Killing Joke
 Jaz Coleman – lead vocals, synthesizer, production
 Kevin "Geordie" Walker – guitar, production
 Martin "Youth" Glover – bass guitar, production
 Paul Ferguson – drums, backing vocals, production

Technical
 Phil Harding - recording engineer, mixing (uncredited)
 Mike Coles - sleeve design (uncredited)
 Don McCullin - photography (uncredited)

Charts

References

External links 

 Killing Joke (Adobe Flash) at Radio3Net (streamed copy where licensed)
 

1980 debut albums
Killing Joke albums
E.G. Records albums